The 2017 Al Habtoor Tennis Challenge was a professional tennis tournament played on outdoor hard courts. It was the twentieth edition of the tournament and was part of the 2017 ITF Women's Circuit. It took place in Dubai, United Arab Emirates, on 11–17 December 2017.

Singles main draw entrants

Seeds 

 1 Rankings as of 4 December 2017.

Other entrants 
The following players received a wildcard into the singles main draw:
  Dalma Gálfi
  Cornelia Lister
  Ayumi Morita
  Anastasia Potapova

The following players received entry from the qualifying draw:
  Fiona Ferro
  Dalila Jakupović
  Michaëlla Krajicek
  Fanny Stollár

Champions

Singles

 Belinda Bencic def.  Ajla Tomljanović, 6–4, 0–0 ret.

Doubles
 
 Mihaela Buzărnescu /  Alena Fomina def.  Lesley Kerkhove /  Lidziya Marozava, 6–4, 6–3

External links 
 2017 Al Habtoor Tennis Challenge at ITFtennis.com
 Official website

2017 ITF Women's Circuit
2017 in Emirati tennis
Al Habtoor Tennis Challenge